Atli Örvarsson (born 7 July 1970) is an Icelandic film score composer. Atli's credits include composing and orchestrating music for some of Hollywood's biggest projects, including the Pirates of the Caribbean series, Angels & Demons, The Holiday, The Eagle, Vantage Point, Babylon A.D., Thick as Thieves, The Fourth Kind, and Season of the Witch. Atli's most recent credits include The Mortal Instruments: City of Bones, Hansel & Gretel: Witch Hunters, A Single Shot, NBC series Chicago Fire, and together with Hans Zimmer contributed music to the Zack Snyder Superman reinstallment Man of Steel.

Originally from the small town of Akureyri, Atli became established in the local music scene at a young age. He earned three platinum and two gold records as a member of the Icelandic band Sálin hans Jóns míns before studying film composing at Berklee College of Music and the University of North Carolina School of the Arts. He excelled in composing and was awarded the Pete Carpenter Fellowship, which brought him to Los Angeles. He began working alongside TV veteran Mike Post on NYPD Blue and three Law & Order brands. Atli soon caught the attention of composer Hans Zimmer, who extended an invitation to join his team at Remote Control Productions.

Filmography

Film

Television

References

External links
 
 
 Interview with Atli Örvarsson at FilmMusicSite

1970 births
Berklee College of Music alumni
Chicago (franchise)
Icelandic film score composers
Living people
Male film score composers